Walmartopia is a musical with music by Andrew Rohn and book by Catherine Capellaro. It is an irreverent political satire of big business and eternal smiley faces, a musical tale of a single mom who speaks up to her corporate employer and finds herself and her young daughter jettisoned to a future where Wal-Mart dominates the entire world.

Productions 
The show premiered in Madison, Wisconsin, before having a run at the New York International Fringe Festival in 2006.

Walmartopia opened off-Broadway at the Minetta Lane Theatre on September 3, 2007, following previews from August 23. The production closed on December 30, 2007, having played 10 preview performances and 136 regular performances.

This show has been performed twice in high school productions, at Cocoa Beach High School in Cocoa Beach, Florida, and at Bishop Carroll Catholic High School in Ebensburg, Pennsylvania.

Musical numbers
From the original, two-act production in Madison, Wisconsin (2006):
 We Want to Know You
 I'm Tired Of Being Nibbled To Death By Guppies
 Listen to the Head

Track listing from the Original Off-Broadway Cast Recording:

 Overture
 A New Age Has Begun  
 American Dream  
 March of The Executives 
 Baby Girl 
 The Future Is Ours  
 A Woman's Place 
 Flash Them Bootstraps  
 Heave-Ho 
 Walmartopia
 Uncle Sam's Commercial  
 American Dream (Reprise)  
 One Stop Salvation 
 The Future Is Ours (Reprise)  
 Socialist Paradise (Suck On This) 
 These Bullets Are Freedom 
 Consume/American Dream (Reprise) 
 What Kind of Mother?  
 Outside the Big Box 
 Band Playout

References

External links
 Official site
 
 https://www.youtube.com/watch?v=rs_hvsnHvzU&list=UUp3N4SdM0pSRovTtlNuHuKA&feature=c4-overview

2007 musicals
Off-Broadway musicals